The Deaf Mute is a 1913 American short war drama black and white film directed by Allen Ramsey, written by Rupert Hughes and produced by Thomas A. Edison. It is the only Kinetophone film shot outside a sound stage.

Cast
 Robert Lawrence as Brigadier General Eldred, U.S.A.
 W.B. Wainwright as Captain Morey, U.S.A.
 Henry Grady as Captain Leigh, U.S.A.
 Robert Lett as Sergeant Giluley, U.S.A.
 George Ballard as Edison Quartette
 O.J. McCormack as Edison Quartette
 Leo Parmet as Edison Quartette
 H.L. Wilson as Edison Quartette

References

External links
 

1913 films
American drama short films
1913 short films
American war drama films
1910s war drama films
American black-and-white films
Films produced by Thomas Edison
Films with screenplays by Rupert Hughes
1913 drama films
1910s American films
Silent war drama films